Midori Fumoto (born 1971) is a former Japanese long-distance runner. She has belonged DEODEO Athletic Club for Women. In 1992 she set a record for best time in a half marathon in Gold Coast, one hour 9 minutes 38 seconds, the record stood for 18 years before being broken by Lisa Jane Weightman.

She was the 1993 winner of the 10,000 metres at the Japan Championships in Athletics.

Competition record

References 

ARRS profile

Living people
1971 births
Sportspeople from Hiroshima
Japanese female long-distance runners
Japan Championships in Athletics winners
20th-century Japanese women
21st-century Japanese women